Taghazout Bay is a seaside resort located in South Morocco. Designed in the framework of the Azur plan, it spreads over a 615 Ha area stretched on a coastline of 2.8 miles of beaches.

This future resort will constitute of sports and leisure facilities, such as a beach club, a medina and golf, tennis, surf and soccer academies.

Société d’Aménagement et de Promotion de la Station de Taghazout (SAPST) 

SAPST is a public limited company with a capital of four hundred million Dirhams (MAD 400,000,000), owned by four renowned Moroccan shareholders:

Since it was established in July 2011, SAPST is responsible for the planning, development and management of the Taghazout Bay station.

Key figures  

 Total area: 615 ha
 Land Use Ratio: 10,5%
 Target number of beds: 12,316 beds
 9 hotel units
 Target Tourist accommodation capacity: 7,450 beds
 Overall investment: MAD 10 billion (before tax)
 Achievement of the Touristic program within 5 years

References

External links 
 Taghazout Bay avance dans les temps (French)
 Les investissements engagés dans Taghazout Bay (French)

Companies established in 2011
Resorts in Morocco